Desmond Mok is a Papua New Guinean rugby league player for the Ipswich Jets. He played for the Kumuls in the 2010 Four Nations.

References
Team Profiles at RLFourNations.com

Papua New Guinean rugby league players
Papua New Guinean sportsmen
Living people
Papua New Guinea national rugby league team players
Ipswich Jets players
Papua New Guinean expatriate rugby league players
Expatriate rugby league players in Australia
Papua New Guinean expatriate sportspeople in Australia
Year of birth missing (living people)